Asemoneinae is a subfamily of jumping spiders (family Salticidae). It was created in 2015 by Wayne Maddison. Most species are found in Africa or Asia. The subfamily initially had five genera, but Hindumanes was later transferred to the subfamily Lyssomaninae.

Description
Members of the subfamily Asemoneinae are translucent and long-legged relative to most other salticids. They resemble members of the subfamilies Onomastinae and Lyssomaninae sensu Madison, 2015. The posterior median eyes are unusually central for salticids, being distinctly closer to the midline than is the inner edge of the anterior lateral eyes.

Taxonomy
In 2015, Wayne Maddison divided the subfamily Lyssomaninae, as circumscribed in 1980 by Wanless, into three subfamilies, Onomastinae, Asemoneinae and Lyssomaninae s.s. Maddison included five genera. Molecular data united the three sampled genera, Asemonea, Goleba and Pandisus. Two genera, Hindumanes and Macopaeus, were included based on previous classifications. In 2017, Hindumanes, whose type species was originally placed in Lyssomanes, was moved to Lyssomaninae s.s., on the basis of the similarity of the male palpal bulb.

Genera
, four genera were placed in the subfamily:
Asemonea O. P.-Cambridge, 1869
Goleba Wanless, 1980
Macopaeus Simon, 1900
Pandisus Simon, 1900

References

Salticidae
Spider subfamilies